Zygoballus remotus is a species of jumping spider which occurs in Guatemala. It was first described by the arachnologists George and Elizabeth Peckham in 1896.

References

External links

Zygoballus remotus at Worldwide database of jumping spiders
Zygoballus remotus at Salticidae: Diagnostic Drawings Library

Salticidae
Spiders described in 1896
Spiders of Central America